is a private junior college in Fukuoka, Fukuoka, Japan, established in 1968. It is affiliated to Kyushu Sangyo University.

External links
 Official website 

Japanese junior colleges
Educational institutions established in 1968
Private universities and colleges in Japan
Universities and colleges in Fukuoka Prefecture